WZZO (95.1 FM "95.1 ZZO") is a commercial radio station licensed to Bethlehem, Pennsylvania.  It is branded as "WZZO: The Valley's Rock Station". 

The station broadcasts a classic rock radio format and is owned by iHeartMedia. Its studio and offices are in the iHeart Broadcasting Complex in Whitehall Township.  

WZZO has an effective radiated power (ERP) of 30,000 watts, covering the Lehigh Valley metropolitan region of Pennsylvania and New Jersey. The transmitter is located off Severn Lane, near Interstate 78 in Lower Saucon Township.  In addition to a standard analog transmission, WZZO broadcasts using HD Radio technology and is available online through iHeartRadio. The HD2 digital subchannel formerly carried a soft adult contemporary format from iHeartRadio known as "The Breeze."
 

WZZO carries Rover's Morning Glory syndicated from WMMS in Cleveland during morning drive time. The station regularly sponsors live music and nightclub events in the Lehigh Valley area.

History
WZZO first signed on the air on February 16, 1946 as WGPA-FM, owned and operated by The Globe-Times.  The broadcast was simulcast during daylight hours with sister station WGPA.  The AM 1100 station is authorized by the Federal Communications Commission to broadcast only from sunrise to sunset, so programming continued on FM station until 11 PM.  At that time WGPA-FM used a sub-carrier to broadcast instrumental beautiful music from reel-to-reel tapes for playing over paging systems inside retail businesses.  Eventually, that same beautiful music sound was airing on WGPA-FM.

In 1973, when WGPA-AM and FM were sold by The Globe-Times to Holt Broadcasting, the new owners changed the FM call sign to WEZV to reflect the FM's easy listening radio format with the EZ in the call letters standing for "Easy" and the V representing "Valley" as in Lehigh Valley.  In 1978, WGPA and WEZV were sold to different owners, and WEZV's call letters changed to WZZO and the format switched to album-oriented rock, which continues to this day.

The broadcast tower remains at its original location off Applebutter Road in Lower Saucon Township and can be spotted from I-78 between the exits for Route 412 and Route 33. The original broadcast studios were at 428 Brodhead Avenue, which now serves as a Lehigh University building in Bethlehem. Before moving to Whitehall Township, the WZZO broadcast studios were located in the Westgate Mall in Bethlehem.

On February 24, 2019, WZZO's Facebook page announced that morning host "The Bearman" had passed away unexpectedly.

HD Radio
WZZO's HD2 station carries "The Breeze", a soft adult contemporary music format from iHeartRadio. Previously, it ran an alternative rock format called "The Alternative Project" and prior to that, a classic rock format.

Programming
WZZO programming from Monday through Friday includes Rover's Morning Glory from WMMS in Cleveland in morning drive time (6am to 10am) followed by Maria Milito (10am to 3pm), Joe Bonadonna in evening drive time (3pm to 7pm), Big Rig (7pm to midnight), and BMAN (midnight to 6am). 

In 2008, the Lehigh Valley IronPigs minor league baseball team began broadcasting their games on WZZO.

Competition
WZZO's primary rock station competitors include Philadelphia's WMMR, WMGK, and WRFF, and the Lehigh Valley's WODE-FM.

Streaming audio
WZZO streams its live audio through both its website (WZZO) and over iHeart (WZZO at iHeart).

See also
Media in the Lehigh Valley

References

External links

Classic rock radio stations in the United States
ZZO
Radio stations established in 1946
1946 establishments in Pennsylvania
IHeartMedia radio stations